These 151 genera belong to Phylini, a tribe of plant bugs in the family Miridae.

 Tribe Phylini Douglas & Scott, 1865
 Subtribe Keltoniina Schuh & Menard, 2013
 Genus Keltonia Knight, 1966 - Nearctic, Mexico
 Genus Pseudatomoscelis Poppius, 1911 - Caribbean, Mexico
 Genus Reuteroscopus Kirkaldy, 1905 - New World
 Genus Waupsallus Linnavuori, 1975 - Africa
 Subtribe Oncotylina Douglas & Scott, 1865
 Genus Acrotelus Reuter, 1885 - Palearctic
 Genus Alloeotarsus Reuter, 1885 - Palearctic
 Genus Americodema T. Henry, 1999 - Nearctic
 Genus Angelopsallus Schuh, 2006 - Western Nearctic
 Genus Antepia Seidenstiicker, 1962 - Palearctic
 Genus Arizonapsallus Schuh, 2006 - Southwest Nearctic
 Genus Asciodema Reuter, 1878 - Palearctic, Nearctic
 Genus Bisulcopsallus Schuh, 2006 - Southwest Nearctic
 Genus Brachyarthrum Fieber, 1858 - Palearctic
 Genus Cariniocoris T. Henry, 1989 - Nearctic
 Genus Ceratopsallus Schuh, 2006 - Western Nearctic
 Genus Cercocarpopsallus Schuh, 2006 - Western Nearctic
 Genus Chlorillus Kerzhner, 1962 - Palearctic
 Genus Compsidolon Reuter, 1899 - Palearctic
 Genus Crassomiris Weirauch, 2006 - Western Nearctic
 Genus Damioscea Reuter, 1883 - Palearctic
 Genus Dasycapsus Poppius, 1912 - Palearctic
 Genus Europiella Reuter, 1909 - Holarctic
 Genus Eurycolpus Reuter, 1875 - Palearctic
 Genus Galbinocoris Weirauch, 2006 - Southwest Nearctic
 Genus Glaucopterum Wagner, 1963 - Palearctic
 Genus Hamatophylus Weirauch, 2006 - Nearctic, Mexico
 Genus Hoplomachus Fieber, 1858 - Holarctic
 Genus Ihermocoris Puton, 1875 - Palearctic
 Genus Insulaphylus Weirauch, 2006 - Nearctic
 Genus Josifovius Konstantinov, 2008 - Nearctic
 Genus Kmentophylus Duwal, Yasunaga, & Lee, 2010 - Palearctic
 Genus Knightophylinia Schaffner, 1978 - Nearctic
 Genus Knightopiella Schuh, 2004 - Western Nearctic
 Genus Knightopsallus Schuh, 2006 - Southwest Nearctic
 Genus Leucodellus Reuter, 1906 - Nearctic
 Genus Lineatopsallus T. Henry, 1991 - Nearctic
 Genus Litoxenus Reuter, 1885 - Eastern Palearctic
 Genus Maculamiris Weirauch, 2006 - Nearctic
 Genus Malacotes Reuter, 1878 - Western Palearctic
 Genus Marrubiocoris Wagner, 1970 - Palearctic
 Genus Megalocoleus Reuter, 1890 - Western Palearctic
 Genus Moiseevichia Schuh, 2006 - Africa
 Genus Nanopsallus Wagner, 1952 - Southwestern Palearctic
 Genus Neopsallus Schuh & Schwartz, 2004 - Western Nearctic
 Genus Occidentodema T. Henry, 1999 - Western Nearctic
 Genus Oligotylus Van Duzee, 1916 - Western Nearctic
 Genus Omocoris Lindberg, 1930 - Palearctic
 Genus Oncotylidea Wagner, 1965 - Palearctic
 Genus Oncotylus Fieber, 1858 - Holarctic
 Genus Opisthotaenia Reuter, 1901 - Palearctic
 Genus Oreocapsus Linnavuori, 1975 - Palearctic
 Genus Parachlorillus Wagner, 1963 - Palearctic
 Genus Parapsallus Wagner, 1952 - Palearctic
 Genus Paredrocoris Reuter, 1878 - Palearctic
 Genus Phaeochiton Kerzhner, 1964 - Palearctic
 Genus Phallospinophylus Weirauch, 2006 - Western Nearctic
 Genus Phyllopidea Knight, 1919 - Western Nearctic
 Genus Phymatopsallus Knight - Western Nearctic, Mexico
 Genus Piceophylus Schwartz & Schuh, 1999 - Eastern Nearctic
 Genus Pinophylus Schwartz & Schuh, 1999 - Nearctic
 Genus Placochilus Fieber, 1858 - Palearctic
 Genus Plagiognathus Fieber, 1858 - Holarctic
 Genus Plesiodema Reuter, 1875 - Holarctic
 Genus Pleuroxonotus Reuter, 1903 - Palearctic
 Genus Pronototropis Reuter, 1879 - Palearctic
 Genus Psallodema V. Putshkov, 1970 - Palearctic
 Genus Psallomorpha Duwal Yasunaga, & Lee, 2010 - Palearctic
 Genus Psallovius T. Henry - Nearctic
 Genus Pygovepres Weirauch, 2006 - Western Nearctic
 Genus Quercophylus Weirauch, 2006 - Western Nearctic
 Genus Quernocoris Weirauch, 2006 - Western Nearctic
 Genus Ranzovius Distant, 1893 - New World
 Genus Rhinocapsus Uhler, 1890 - Eastern Nearctic
 Genus Roburocoris Weirauch, 2009 - Nearctic
 Genus Rubellomiris Weirauch, 2006 - Nearctic
 Genus Rubeospineus Weirauch, 2006 - Nearctic
 Genus Sacculifer Kerzhner, 1959 - Palearctic
 Genus Salicopsallus Schuh, 2006 - Western Nearctic
 Genus Schaffneropsallus Schuh, 2006 - Nearctic
 Genus Stenoparia Fieber, 1870 - Palearctic
 Genus Sthenaropsidea Henry & Schuh, 2002 - Eastern Nearctic
 Genus Stictopsallus Schuh, 2006 - Western Nearctic
 Genus Stirophylus Eckerlein & Wagner, 1965 - Palearctic
 Genus Stoebea Schuh, 1974 - Africa
 Genus Tapirula Carapezza, 1997 - Palearctic
 Genus Tinicephalus Fieber, 1858 - Palearctic
 Genus Tragiscocoris Fieber, 1861 - Palearctic
 Genus Vanduzeephylus Schuh & Schwartz, 2004 - Western Nearctic
 Genus Vesperocoris Weirauch, 2006 - Western Nearctic
 Genus Viscacoris Weirauch, 2009 - Southwest Nearctic, Mexico
 Genus Zophocnemis Kerzhner, 1962 - Palearctic
 Subtribe Phylina Douglas & Scott, 1865
 Genus Adelphophylus Wagner, 1959 - Palearctic
 Genus Agraptocoris Reuter, 1903 - Palearctic
 Genus Alnopsallus Duwal, Yasunaga, & Lee, 2010 - Himalayan
 Genus Alvarengamiris Carvalho, 1991 - Neotropics
 Genus Amazonophilus Carvalho & Costa, 1993 - Neotropics
 Genus Anapsallus Odhiambo, 1960 - Africa
 Genus Anomalocornis Carvalho & Wygodzinsky, 1945 - Neotropics
 Genus Arlemiris Carvalho, 1984 - Neotropics
 Genus Bicurvicoris Carvalho & Schaffner, 1973 - Neotropics
 Genus Botocudomiris Carvalho, 1979 - Neotropics
 Genus Brachycranella Reuter, 1905 - Africa
 Genus Conostethus Fieber, 1858 - Holarctic
 Genus Crassicornus Carvalho, 1945 - Neotropics
 Genus Darectagela Linnavuori, 1975 - Palearctic
 Genus Darfuromma Linnavuori, 1975 - Africa
 Genus Dignaia Linnavuori, 1975 - Palearctic
 Genus Dominiquella Linnavuori, 1983 - Africa
 Genus Ectagela Schmidt, K., 1939 - Palearctic, Africa
 Genus Ellacapsus Yasunaga, 2013 - Orient
 Genus Eremophylus Yasunaga, 2001 - Palearctic
 Genus Farsiana Linnavuori, 1998 - Palearctic
 Genus Gediocoris Wagner, 1964 - Palearctic
 Genus Ghazalocoris Linnavuori, 1975 - Africa
 Genus Gressittocapsus Schuh, 1984 - Orient
 Genus Icodema Reuter, 1875 - Western Palearctic
 Genus Indatractus Linnavuori, 1975 - Palearctic
 Genus Izyaius Schwartz, 2006 - Eastern Nearctic
 Genus Juniperia Linnavuori, 1965 - Palearctic
 Genus Knightensis Schaffner, 1978 - Nearctic
 Genus Lalyocoris Linnavuori, 1993 - Africa
 Genus Lasiolabopella Schuh, 1974 - Africa
 Genus Lepidargyrus Muminov, 1962 - Palearctic
 Genus Lepidocapsus Poppius, 1914 - Africa
 Genus Leptoxanthus Reuter, 1905 - Africa
 Genus Liviopsallus Carapezza, 1982 - Palearctic
 Genus Mendozaphylus Carvalho & Carpintero, 1991 - Neotropics
 Genus Millerimiris Carvalho, 1951 - Africa
 Genus Mixtecamiris Carvalho & Schaffner, 1973 - Nearctic
 Genus Natalophylus Schuh, 1974 - Africa
 Genus Nubaia Linnavuori, 1975 - Palearctic
 Genus Orthonotus Stephens, 1829 - Palearctic
 Genus Parafulvius Carvalho, 1954 - Neotropics
 Genus Paravoruchia Wagner, 1959 - Palearctic
 Genus Phylus Hahn, 1831 - Palearctic
 Genus Plagiognathidea Poppius, 1914 - Africa
 Genus Platyscytisca Costa & Henry, 1999 - Neotropics
 Genus Platyscytus Reuter, 1907 - Neotropics
 Genus Porophoroptera Carvalho & Gross, 1982 - Australia
 Genus Psallus Fieber, 1858 - Holarctic
 Genus Roudairea Puton & Reuter, 1886 - Palearctic
 Genus Sasajiophylus Yasunaga, 2001 - Palearctic
 Genus Somalocoris Linnavuori, 1975 - Palearctic
 Genus Sthenarus Fieber, 1858 - Palearctic
 Genus Stibaromma Odhiambo, 1961 - Africa
 Genus Tibiopilus Carvalho & Costa, 1993 - Neotropics
 Genus Trevessa China, 1924 - Indian Ocean
 Genus Villaverdea Carvalho, 1990 - Neotropics
 Genus Widdringtoniola Schuh, 1974 - Africa
 Genus Zakanocoris V. Putshkov, 1970 - Palearctic
 Genus Zanchiophylus Duwal, Yasunaga, & Lee, 2010 - Palearctic

References